The Lika is a breed of sheep from the mountainous regions of Lika and Gorski Kotar in Croatia.

References

External links

Sheep breeds originating in Croatia
Biota of Croatia
Lika